Prevalje is a settlement south of Šentvid pri Lukovici in the Municipality of Lukovica in the eastern part of the Upper Carniola region of Slovenia.

References

External links

Prevalje on Geopedia

Populated places in the Municipality of Lukovica